Ambohimanjaka is a town and commune in Madagascar. It belongs to the district of Ambohidratrimo (district), which is a part of Analamanga Region.
It lies North West from the capital Antananarivo.  The population of the commune was estimated to be approximately 5,284 in 2018.

References and notes 

Monographie Region Analamanga

Populated places in Analamanga